Bromide peroxidase (bromoperoxidase, haloperoxidase (ambiguous), eosinophil peroxidase) is a family of enzymes with systematic name bromide:hydrogen-peroxide oxidoreductase. These enzymes catalyses the following chemical reaction:

 HBr + H2O2   HOBr  +  H2O

The HOBr is a potent brominating agent.  The many organobromine compounds observed in marine environments are the products of reaction with this oxidized form of bromine.

Bromo peroxidases of red and brown marine algae (Rhodophyta and Phaeophyta) contain vanadate (vanadium bromoperoxidase).  Otherwise vanadium is unusual cofactor in biology. By virtue of this family of enzymes, a variety of brominated natural products have been isolated from marine sources.

Related chloroperoxidase enzymes effect chlorination. In the nomenclature of haloperoxidase, bromoperoxidases classically are unable to oxidize chloride at all. For example, eosinophil peroxidase appears to prefer bromide over chloride, yet is not considered a bromoperoxidase because it is able to use chloride.

Muricidae (was Murex) spp. snails have a bromoperoxidase used to produce Tyrian purple dye. The enzyme is very specific to bromide and physically stable, but has not been characterized as to its active site metal. , no specific gene has been assigned to such an enzyme in the snail genome. Such an activity is probably provided by symbiotic Bacillus bacteria instead. It runs on a catalytic triad of Ser 99, Asp 229 and His 258 and does not require metal cofactors.

Additional reading

References

External links 
 

EC 1.11.1